Paul Deacon (born 13 February 1979) is an English rugby union coach who is the head coach of the Sale Sharks in Premiership Rugby, and former a professional rugby league footballer and coach.

Deacon followed this with becoming a member of Wigan's coaching staff, working closely with manager Shaun Wane.

Background
Deacon was born in Wigan, Greater Manchester, England.

Playing career

1990s
Hailing from Standish near Wigan, a former Hindley amateur, Deacon made his senior professional début four days before his 18th birthday as a substitute for Oldham in a 48–6 RL Challenge Cup fourth round home victory over Rochdale Hornets on 9 February 1997. He made only four appearances for Oldham before moving to the Bradford Bulls. He has been one of Bradford Bulls' most influential players in the 21st century so far. He signed for the Bradford Bulls from Oldham, and came through the youth system at the same time as Jamie Peacock and Stuart Fielden. Deacon won caps for England while at the Bradford Bulls in 1999 against France (2 matches). Deacon played for the Bradford Bulls from the interchange bench in the 1999 Super League Grand Final which was lost to St. Helens.

2000s
Deacon played for England in their 2000 World Cup campaign against Russia, Fiji, Ireland and New Zealand, and in 2001 against Wales. He went on to be one of Bradford Bulls' key players, a superb organiser with a tremendous kicking game. For Great Britain he won caps while at the Bradford Bulls in 2001 against France and Australia. Deacon played for the Bradford Bulls from the interchange bench in their 2001 Super League Grand Final victory against the Wigan Warriors. As Super League VI champions, the Bradford Bulls played against 2001 NRL Premiers, the Newcastle Knights in the 2002 World Club Challenge. He was awarded the Harry Sunderland Trophy as grand final man-of-the-match despite being on the losing side.
In the seasons of 2002 and 2003 Deacon's goal kicking percentage was near 80%. He represented Great Britain in 2002 against New Zealand (3 matches), in 2003 against Australia (2 matches, plus 1 as sub).

On 23 June 2006, Paul Deacon broke the record points scored for a Bradford Norther/Bradford Bulls player (1,834), which was previously held by Keith Mumby. 

In 2007 Paul became the Bradford Bulls captain taking over from Iestyn Harris. In August 2007 he was named in Bradford Bull' Team of the Century. In September 2007 Deacon reached 2,000 goals for the Bradford Bulls. Deacon was recalled for the Great Britain train-on squad for the 2007 test series with New Zealand, but pulled out due to injury. In 2008 Deacon celebrated his testimonial year with the Bradford Bulls after 10-years of service for the Super League club. As well as a testimonial match against his hometown club Wigan Warriors in January, Paul Deacon's name also appeared on all away jerseys to commemorate his loyalty to the Bradford Bulls. On 16 April 2008 Paul signed a new 2-year contract until 2010. He was forced to rule himself out of contention for the England training squad for the 2008 Rugby League World Cup through injury. In November 2009, Deacon signed for Wigan after 11-years at the Bradford Bulls.

2010s
Deacon appeared in his first Grand Final in 5-years by playing in the 2010 Super League Grand Final victory over St Helens at Old Trafford.

Deacon played in the 2011 Challenge Cup Final 28–18 victory over the Leeds Rhinos at Wembley Stadium.

Coaching career

Rugby League
Following his retirement from playing, Deacon joined Wigan's coaching staff where he remained for four years.

In 2013, Deacon was appointed assistant to Steve McNamara at the England national rugby league team, just before the beginning of the 2013 Rugby League World Cup.

Rugby Union
In July 2015 it was confirmed that Deacon would switch codes and join Premiership rugby union side Sale Sharks as attack/skills coach. He was promoted to head coach in December 2020 following the departure of director of rugby Steve Diamond.

Statistics

Club career

Representative career

References

External links

Paul Deacon Statistics at wigan.rlfans.com
(archived by web.archive.org) Paul Deacon Official player page
(archived by web.archive.org) 2001 Ashes profile
(archived by web.archive.org) Deacon replaces Harris as skipper
(archived by web.archive.org) Team Of The Century
Statistics at orl-heritagetrust.org.uk

1979 births
Living people
Bradford Bulls captains
Bradford Bulls players
England national rugby league team players
English rugby league players
English rugby union coaches
Great Britain national rugby league team players
Lancashire rugby league team players
Oldham R.L.F.C. players
Rugby league five-eighths
Rugby league halfbacks
Rugby league players from Wigan
Sale Sharks coaches
Wigan Warriors players